This is a list of countries and territories by their average elevation above sea level.

List

Per sources:

See also
List of elevation extremes by country
List of highest points of African countries
List of highest points of Asian countries
List of highest points of European countries
List of islands by highest point
List of highest towns by country
List of highest mountains on Earth

References

Elevation